Ben Hill County is a county located in the U.S. state of Georgia. As of the 2020 census, the population was 17,194. The county seat is Fitzgerald. The county was organized in 1906. It is named after Benjamin Harvey Hill, a former Confederate and United States Senator.

Ben Hill County comprises the Fitzgerald, Georgia, Micropolitan Statistical Area. The Ben Hill County Courthouse and Ben Hill County Jail are listed on the National Register of Historic Places.

History
The timber industry became important in the county in the early 20th century. After the market changed, some workers moved on to other locations, including Florida. Development of citrus production in large groves had increased the demand for workers.

Geography

The majority of Ben Hill County, its northern and eastern portions, are located in the Lower Ocmulgee River sub-basin of the Altamaha River basin. The northwestern corner of the county, east of Rebecca, is located in the Alapaha River sub-basin of the Suwannee River basin. The southeastern corner of the county, east of Fitzgerald, is located in the Satilla River sub-basin of the St. Marys-Satilla River basin.

Major highways

  U.S. Route 129
  U.S. Route 319
  State Route 11
  State Route 90
  State Route 107
  State Route 125
  State Route 182
  State Route 206
  State Route 215
  State Route 233

Adjacent counties
 Wilcox County - north
 Telfair County - northeast
 Coffee County - east
 Irwin County - south
 Turner County - west

Demographics

2000 census
As of the census of 2000, there were 17,484 people, 6,673 households, and 4,631 families living in the county. There were 7,623 housing units at an average density of 30 per square mile (12/km2). The racial makeup of the county was 63.25% White, 32.64% Black or African American, 0.21% Native American, 0.28% Asian, 2.85% from other races, and 0.77% from two or more races.  4.58% of the population were Hispanic or Latino of any race.

There were 6,673 households, out of which 33.20% had children under the age of 18 living with them, 47.20% were married couples living together, 17.40% had a female householder with no husband present, and 30.60% were non-families. 26.70% of all households were made up of individuals, and 11.90% had someone living alone who was 65 years of age or older.  The average household size was 2.57 and the average family size was 3.09.

In the county, the population was spread out, with 27.50% under the age of 18, 9.70% from 18 to 24, 27.00% from 25 to 44, 22.50% from 45 to 64, and 13.30% who were 65 years of age or older.  The median age was 35 years. For every 100 females, there were 91.80 males.  For every 100 females age 18 and over, there were 88.00 males.

The median income for a household in the county was $27,100, and the median income for a family was $33,023. Males had a median income of $26,750 versus $19,547 for females. The per capita income for the county was $14,093.  22.30% of the population and 18.70% of families were below the poverty line.  Out of the total people living in poverty, 33.30% are under the age of 18 and 17.60% are 65 or older.

2010 census
As of the 2010 United States Census, there were 17,634 people, 6,794 households, and 4,730 families living in the county. The racial makeup of the county was 59.2% white, 34.6% black or African American, 0.7% Asian, 0.3% American Indian, 3.8% from other races, and 1.3% from two or more races. Those of Hispanic or Latino origin made up 5.8% of the population. In terms of ancestry, 13.7% were English, 11.4% were American, and 8.3% were Irish.

Of the 6,794 households, 36.5% had children under the age of 18 living with them, 45.1% were married couples living together, 19.1% had a female householder with no husband present, 30.4% were non-families, and 26.7% of all households were made up of individuals. The average household size was 2.55 and the average family size was 3.07. The median age was 37.1 years.

The median income for a household in the county was $30,134 and the median income for a family was $35,868. Males had a median income of $32,613 versus $23,320 for females. The per capita income for the county was $15,529. About 22.7% of families and 26.9% of the population were below the poverty line, including 39.0% of those under age 18 and 16.3% of those age 65 or over.

2020 census

As of the 2020 United States census, there were 17,194 people, 6,443 households, and 4,019 families residing in the county.

Education
The Ben Hill County School District operates schools serving the county.
 Ben Hill Preschool
 Ben Hill County Primary School
 Ben Hill County Elementary School
 Ben Hill County Middle School
 Fitzgerald High School

Politics

Communities

City
 Fitzgerald (county seat)

Unincorporated communities
 Bowen's Mill
 Queensland

Transportation
 Fitzgerald Municipal Airport is a public use airport located 2 miles southwest of Fitzgerald.

See also

 National Register of Historic Places listings in Ben Hill County, Georgia
List of counties in Georgia

References

External links
 Ben Hill County historical marker

 
1906 establishments in Georgia (U.S. state)
Populated places established in 1906
Georgia (U.S. state) counties
Fitzgerald, Georgia micropolitan area